The huge moth family Noctuidae contains the following genera:

A B C D E F G H I J K L M N O P Q R S T U V W X Y Z

Xandria
Xanthanomis
Xanthia
Xanthiria
Xanthirinopsis
Xanthocosmia
Xanthodesma
Xanthograpta
Xantholepis
Xanthomera
Xanthomixis
Xanthopastis
Xanthospilopteryx
Xanthostha
Xanthothrix
Xenapamea
Xenopachnobia
Xenophysa
Xenopseustis
Xenotrachea
Xerociris
Xestia
Xiana
Xipholeucania
Xoria
Xylena
Xylinissa
Xyliodes
Xylis
Xylocampa
Xylomania
Xylomoia
Xylophylla
Xylopolia
Xylormisa
Xylostola
Xylotype
Xymehops
Xystopeplus

References 

 Natural History Museum Lepidoptera genus database

 
Noctuid genera X